Marianne A. Ferber (January 30, 1923 – May 11, 2013) was an American feminist economist and the author of many books and articles on the subject of women's work, the family, and the construction of gender.  She held a Ph.D. from the University of Chicago.

She was most noted for her work as co-editor with Julie A. Nelson of the influential anthology Beyond Economic Man: Feminist Theory and Economics and her book The Economics of Women, Men and Work, co-authored with Francine D. Blau and Anne Winkler.

Highly regarded for her role as a central figure in the development of feminist economics, Ferber expanded the literature on women’s presence in the economy.  She was one of the first people to confront Gary Becker’s work on economics and the family.

Background
Ferber was born in Czechoslovakia and received her B.A. at McMaster University in Hamilton, Canada and her Ph.D. at the University of Chicago.

Her husband, Robert Ferber, was hired by the University of Illinois to teach in the economics department in 1948, but strict nepotism rules at Illinois prevented her from being hired as a full-time professor. Yet the economics department did hire her on a semester-by-semester basis because of a severe teacher shortage. In 1971, she was promoted from lecturer to assistant professor. In 1979, she became a full professor.

Career and awards
Ferber was a professor of economics and served as head of women's studies (from 1979–1983 and 1991–1993) at University of Illinois at Urbana-Champaign; subsequently a professor emerita. From 1993-1995, she was the Horner Distinguished Visiting Professor at Radcliffe College. She served as a professor of economics at the University of Illinois for 38 years.

In the 1970s, she was a member of the Committee on the Status of Women in the Economics Profession. Later, she became a founding member of the International Association for Feminist Economics (IAFFE) and in 1995 and 1996 served as IAFFE’s president.

Also, she was the president of the Midwest Economic Association and received the McMaster University 1996 Distinguished Alumni Award for the Arts.

Major publications
In 1987, "Women and Work, Paid and Unpaid" was published, which is considered a comprehensive cataloging of economic research on women’s work before feminist economics emerged.

In 1991, Ferber co-edited with Brigid O’Farrell "Work and Families: Policies for a Changing Work Force." Ferber and O’Farrell address how more women have entered the work force, which results in both parents being employed.  The result is that the burden on familial responsibilities and childcare must be readjusted if women are now entering the work force because work often conflicts with family duties, so employers must make adjustments in benefits, for example, to redress the changing situations of their employees.

In 1993, the anthology "Beyond Economic Man: Feminist Theory and Economics" became one of the first tomes to compile work done by women and men who label themselves feminist economists and have an expressed interest in how women uniquely are impacted by economics.  The overall conclusion from the compilation is that economics needs to remove itself from perpetuating masculine biases about how work must be done and to what extent certain work is valuable.

In 1997, the third edition of "The Economics of Women, Men, and Work," co-authored with Francine D. Blau and Anne Winkler, was published and is often used as a textbook and reference for how women have functioned in the economy and the role women have played in defining their own work while addressing gender issues in the family.

Selected excerpts 
"Models of free individual choice are not adequate to analyze behavior fraught with issues of dependence, interdependence, tradition, and power. Tradition, in particular, may be a far more powerful force in determining allocation of household tasks than rational optimization."

"Eliminating androcentrism would involve not merely localized modifications but altering a self-image and a worldview with deep emotional as well as intellectual roots."

Selected works

Books
 
 
 
 
 
Reviewed by

Journal articles
 
  - Tribute edition for Barbara Bergmann.

See also 
 Feminist economics
 List of feminist economists

References

Further reading

External links
International Association for Feminist Economics (IAFFE)
Journal of Feminist Economics

1923 births
2013 deaths
Criticisms of economics
Feminist economists
American women economists
American economists
McMaster University alumni
University of Chicago alumni
University of Illinois Urbana-Champaign faculty
Czechoslovak emigrants to the United States
21st-century American women
Presidents of the International Association for Feminist Economics